Furg (also Romanized as Fūrg, Fūrk, and Foorag) is a village in Darmian Rural District, in the Central District of Darmian County, South Khorasan Province, Iran. At the 2006 census, its population was 854, in 240 families.

See also

 Furg Citadel

References 

Populated places in Darmian County